Morgan's Mount is a structure extending from the north side of the city walls of Chester, in Cheshire, England. It is recorded in the National Heritage List for England as a designated Grade I listed building.

History
It was constructed in 1645 during the siege of Chester in the Civil War as an observation platform and gun emplacement.  After the Battle of Rowton Heath in September of that year, a gun on the Mount was destroyed by Parliamentary forces. It was originally named the Raised Square Platform, and is said to have been named later after the Royalist Captain William Morgan, or his son, Edward.

Architecture

The Mount is constructed in red sandstone coursed rubble, and is rectangular in shape. It contains a chamber at the level of the walkway, with barred openings to the west and the north. Two flights of five steps lead up to the roof, which has a stone parapet surmounted by an iron railing. One of the steps has a reused Victorian gravestone.
At the northeast corner of the roof is an L-shaped stone bench. Providing good views of the welsh hills beyond.

Sculpture
At the base of the tower is a life size sculpture representing the civil war cannon destroyed.

See also

Grade I listed buildings in Cheshire West and Chester

References
Citations

Sources

 

Grade I listed buildings in Chester